is a Japanese former professional tennis player.

Hirose, who reached a best singles ranking of 216, qualified for the main draw of two WTA Tour tournaments, the 1993 Toray Pan Pacific Open and 1994 Nichirei International Championships.

In doubles, Hirose was ranked as high as 115 in the world and made the second round at the 1992 Australian Open.

ITF finals

Singles: 2 (1–1)

Doubles: 8 (3–5)

References

External links
 
 

1969 births
Living people
Japanese female tennis players
20th-century Japanese women
21st-century Japanese women